You Are There is the fourth studio album by Japanese instrumental rock band Mono. A double album, it was released on March 15, 2006. The album was recorded in 2005 at Electrical Audio in Chicago, Illinois with recording engineer Steve Albini. The CD version comes with a removable paper slipcase around the jewelcase which can be flipped around to provide two different versions of cover art.

Track listing

Personnel
 Takaakira Goto – lead guitar
 Yoda – rhythm guitar
 Tamaki Kunishi – bass guitar
 Yasunori Takada – drum kit

References

External links
You Are There on Last.fm

Mono (Japanese band) albums
2006 albums
Albums produced by Steve Albini